Jawbreaker: The Attack on Bin Laden and Al-Qaeda: A Personal Account by the CIA's Key Field Commander (2005) is an autobiographical book by CIA agent Gary Berntsen describing the time he spent in Afghanistan at the beginning of the American campaign against the Taliban, al-Qaeda and Osama bin Laden after the September 11, 2001 attacks.

In his acknowledgements, Berntsen describes that his original manuscript was reviewed by the CIA as per agency guidelines that stipulate all publishable works detailing an agent's career must be reviewed by the CIA's Publications Review Board (PRB). The text of the book contains redactions to indicate where material has been censored to protect information and context the CIA deems classified.

In October 2006, Paramount Pictures announced that Oliver Stone would direct a film based on Berntsen's book, the rights to which had been bought earlier in the year.  This would follow Stone's 2006 film, World Trade Center, the September 11th attacks.

Release details
2005, United States, Crown Publishers , Pub date 27 December 2005, Hardcover
2006, United States, Three Rivers Press , Pub date 24 December 2006, Paperback

See also
Battle of Tora Bora
Operation Enduring Freedom
Special Activities Division

References

External links
Presentation by Gary Berntsen and Ralph Pezzullo on Jawbreaker, January 17, 2006

2005 non-fiction books
Books about terrorism
War on Terror books
Political books
Political autobiographies